The post–Cold War era is a period of history that follows the end of the Cold War, which represents history after the 1991 fall of the Soviet Union. This period saw the United States become the world's sole superpower in the world and the world order become unipolar. 

Relatively to the Cold War, the period is characterized by stabilization and disarmament. Both the United States and Russia significantly reduced their nuclear stockpiles. The former Eastern Bloc became democratic and was integrated into world economy. Most of former Soviet satellites and three former Baltic Republics were integrated into the European Union and NATO. In the first two decades of the period, NATO underwent three series of enlargement and France reintegrated into the NATO command.

Russia formed CSTO to replace the dissolved Warsaw Pact, established strategic partnership with China and several other countries and entered non-military organizations Shanghai and BRICS. Both latter organizations included China, which is a fast rising power. Reacting on the rise of China, the Obama administration rebalanced strategic forces to the Asia-Pacific region.

Major crises of the period included the Gulf War, Yugoslav Wars, NATO bombing of Yugoslavia, First and Second Chechen War, September 11 attacks, War in Afghanistan (2001–2021), Iraq War, Russo-Georgian War and the ongoing Russo-Ukrainian War. Another ongoing war, the Syrian Civil War, is widely described as a series of overlapping proxy wars between the regional and world powers, primarily between the US and Russia.

With the coming to power of Vladimir Putin, Russia gradually became more authoritarian and its foreign policy more aggressive. This resulted in deterioration of the relations with the West and culminating with sanctions, military aid to Ukraine, international isolation, and a prospect of further NATO enlargement.

Background

Faced with the threat of growing German and Italian fascism, Japanese Shōwa statism, and a world war, the Western Allies and the Soviet Union made an alliance of necessity during World War II. After the Axis powers were defeated, the two most powerful states in the world became the Soviet Union and the United States. Both federations were called the world's superpowers. The underlying geopolitical and ideological differences between the recent allies led to mutual suspicions and shortly to confrontation between the two, known as the Cold War, which lasted from about 1947 to 1991. It began with the second Red Scare and ended with the fall of the Soviet Union, though some date the end to the Revolutions of 1989 or the world's first treaty on nuclear disarmament signed in 1987 . A prominent historian of the Cold War, John Lewis Gaddis, wrote at the dawn of the post–Cold War era that the characteristics of the new era are not yet certain but that it was certain that it would be very different from the Cold War era and that it meant that a turning point of world-historical significance took place:

Consequences of the fall of the Soviet Union
During the Cold War, much of the policy and the infrastructure of the Western world and the Eastern Bloc had revolved around the capitalist and communist ideologies, respectively, and the possibility of a nuclear warfare. The end of the Cold War and the fall of the Soviet Union caused profound changes in nearly every society in the world. It enabled renewed attention to be paid to matters that were ignored during the Cold War and has paved the way for greater international cooperation, international organizations, and nationalist movements. The European Union expanded and further integrated, and power shifted from the G7 to the larger G20 economies.

The outcome symbolized a victory of democracy and capitalism which became a manner of collective self-validation for countries hoping to gain international respect. With democracy being seen as an important value, more countries began adopting that value. Communism ended also in Mongolia, Congo, Albania, Yugoslavia, Afghanistan, and Angola. As of 2023, only five countries in the world are still ruled as communist states: China, Cuba, North Korea, Laos, and Vietnam.

The United States, having become the only global superpower, used that ideological victory to reinforce its leadership position in the new world order. It claimed “the United States and its allies are on the right side of history.” Using the peace dividend, the United States military was able to cut much of its expenditure, but the level rose again to comparable heights after the September 11 attacks and the initiation of the War on Terror in 2001. Accompanying NATO expansion, Ballistic Missile Defense (BMD) systems were installed in Eastern Europe. The US also became the most dominant over the newly-connecting global economy. However, from a relatively-weak developing country, China appeared as a fledgling emerging superpower. That created new potential for worldwide conflict. In response to the rise of China, the United States has strategically "rebalanced" to the Asia-Pacific region, though at the same time, began to retreat from international commitments.

Government, economic, and military institutions
The end of the Cold War also coincided with the end of apartheid in South Africa. Declining Cold War tensions in the later years of the 1980s meant that the apartheid regime was no longer supported by the West because of its anticommunism, but it was now condemned with an embargo. In 1990, Nelson Mandela was freed from prison and the regime began steps to end apartheid. This culminated in the first democratic elections in 1994, which resulted in Mandela being elected as President of South Africa.

Socialist and communist parties around the world saw drops in membership after the Berlin Wall fell, and the public felt that free-market ideology had won. Libertarian, neoliberal, nationalist and Islamist parties, on the other hand, benefited from the fall of the Soviet Union. As capitalism had "won," as people saw it, socialism and communism in general declined in popularity. Social Democrats in Scandinavia privatized many of their institutions in the 1990s, and a political debate on modern economics was reopened.  Scandinavian nations are often now seen as social democrat (see Nordic model).

The People's Republic of China, which had started to move towards capitalism in the late 1970s and faced public anger after the Tiananmen Square protests of 1989 in Beijing, moved even more quickly towards free-market economics in the 1990s. McDonald's and Pizza Hut both entered the country in the second half of 1990, the first American chains in China, aside from Kentucky Fried Chicken, which had entered in 1987. Stock markets were established in Shenzhen and Shanghai in late 1990 as well. Restrictions on car ownership were loosened in the early 1990s and caused the bicycle to decline as a form of transport by 2000. The move to capitalism has increased the economic prosperity of China, but many people still live in poor conditions and work for companies for very low wages and in dangerous and poor conditions.

Many other Third World countries had seen involvement from the United States and/or the Soviet Union but solved their political conflicts because of the removal of the ideological interests of those superpowers. As a result of the apparent victory of democracy and capitalism in the Cold War, many more countries adapted these systems, which also allowed them access to the benefits of global trade, as economic power became more prominent than military power in the international arena. However, as the United States maintained global power, its role in many regime changes during the Cold War went mostly officially unacknowledged, even when some, such as El Salvador and Argentina, resulted in extensive human rights violations.

Technology
The end of the Cold War allowed many technologies that had been off limits to the public to be declassified. The most important of these is the Internet, which was created as ARPANET by the Pentagon as a system to keep in touch after an impending nuclear war. The last restrictions on commercial enterprise online were lifted in 1995. The commercialization of the Internet and the growth of the mobile phone system increased globalization (as well as nationalism and populism in reaction).

In the years since then, the Internet's population and usefulness have grown immensely. Only about 20 million people (less than 0.5 percent of the world's population at the time) were online in 1995, mostly in the US and several other Western countries. By the mid-2010s, more than a third of the world's population was online.

Further research continued into other Cold War technologies with the declassification of the Internet. While Reagan‘s Strategic Defense Initiative proved untenable in its original form, the system lives on in a redesigned state as the Aegis Ballistic Missile Defense System (BMDS). Countermeasures such as BMDS continue to be explored and improved upon post Cold War, but are often criticized for being unable to effectively stop a full nuclear attack. Despite advances in their efficacy, Anti-ballistic missiles are often viewed as an additional piece to modern day diplomacy where concepts such as Mutual assured destruction (MAD) and treaties such as that between Ronald Reagan and Mikhail Gorbachev following their Reykjavík Summit.

Alongside continued research defensive countermeasures there has been a proliferation of nuclear weapons around the world. Many nations have acquired technology required to produce nuclear weapons since the end of the Cold War. Pakistan’s nuclear program acquired Centrifuges capable of enriching uranium in the 80‘s and in 1998 was able to conduct several underground tests. Today the United States, Russia, the United Kingdom, France, and China all posses nuclear weapons and have signed the Nuclear Non-Proliferation Treaty in an attempt to curb the spread of nuclear weapons. Pakistan, India, and North Korea are also in possession of nuclear technology but have not signed the Nuclear Non-Proliferation Treaty.

The Cold War brought with it increased research into radio technology as well as nuclear weapons. The success of Sputnik 1 lead to an increase funding for Radio telescopes such as Jodrell Bank Observatory for use in tracking Sputnik and possible nuclear launches by the Soviet Union. Jodrell Bank and other observatories like it have since been used to track Space probes as well as investigate Quasars, Pulsars, and Meteoroids. Satellites such as the Vela (satellite) that were originally launched to detect nuclear detonation following the Partial Nuclear Test Ban Treaty have been used since then to discover and further investigate Gamma-ray bursts.

See also
International relations since 1989
Second Cold War
Cold War
Middle-Eastern Cold War
AI Arms Race
Arms race
Nuclear arms race
Digital Revolution
Postmodernism
War on terror
Cold peace
Interwar period
Road to Now

References

Further reading
 Aziz, Nusrate, and M. Niaz Asadullah. "Military spending, armed conflict and economic growth in developing countries in the post–Cold War era." Journal of Economic Studies 44.1 (2017): 47-68.

 Henriksen, Thomas H. Cycles in US Foreign Policy Since the Cold War (Palgrave Macmillan, 2017).
 Jones, Bruce D., and Stephen John Stedman. "Civil Wars & the Post–Cold War International Order." Dædalus 146#4 (2017): 33-44.
 Menon, Rajan, and Eugene B. Rumer, eds. Conflict in Ukraine: The Unwinding of the Post–Cold War Order (MIT Press, 2015).
 Peterson, James W. Russian-American relations in the post–Cold War world (Oxford UP, 2017).
 Sakwa, Richard. Russia against the Rest: The Post–Cold War Crisis of World Order (Cambridge UP, 2017)  362pp online review
 Wood, Luke B. "The politics of identity and security in post–Cold War Western and Central Europe." European Politics and Society 18.4 (2017): 552-556.

 
Cold War
Historical eras
Information Age
Contemporary history
Aftermath of the Cold War